The 2018–19 Brunei Super League (also known as the DST Super League for sponsorship reasons) is the 6th season of the Brunei Super League, the top Bruneian professional league for association football clubs, since its establishment in 2012. The season began on 26 October 2018.

Champions

Teams
A total of 10 teams competed in the league. MS ABDB were the defending champions. Menglait and Jerudong were relegated from last season, and were replaced by promoted teams Setia Perdana and IKLS. Tabuan Muda, the youth team ran by the National Football Association of Brunei Darussalam, entered the Premier League instead of the Super League for this season.
IKLS
Indera
Kasuka
Kota Ranger
Lun Bawang
MS ABDB
MS PDB
Najip
Setia Perdana
Wijaya

League table

See also
2018–19 Brunei FA Cup

References

External links
National Football Association of Brunei Darussalam website 

Brunei Super League seasons
2018 in Brunei football
2019 in Brunei football
Brunei